Gustavo Suárez Pertierra (born 1949) is a Spanish jurist and politician. He served as Minister of Education and as Minister of Defence during the governments of Felipe González.

Biography 
Born on 27 February 1949 in Cudillero. He earned a PhD in Law at the University of Valladolid. He lectured in canon law at the University of Oviedo and the University of Valladolid, later holding the Chair of Canon Law at the Complutense University of Madrid (UCM). He briefly served as President of the University Socialist Grouping (ASU) in the 1980s.

He served as Undersecretary of Defence from 1984 to 1990 and as Secretary of State of Military Administration from 1990 to 1993. He was appointed Minister of Education and Science in 1993. In 1995, after a cabinet reshuffle, he changed portfolio and assumed the post of Minister of Defence on 3 July, in replacement of Julián García Vargas.

He ran as candidate to deputy 2nd in the PSOE list in Asturias for the 1996 general election and became a member of the 6th term of the Congress of Deputies (1996–2000).

He presided over the Elcano Royal Institute from 2005 to 2012.

References 

Members of the 6th Congress of Deputies (Spain)
Defence ministers of Spain
Academic staff of the Complutense University of Madrid
1949 births
Living people
Academic staff of the University of Valladolid
University of Valladolid alumni
Academic staff of the University of Oviedo